Suryadeo Law College or S.D. Law College is a Law school situated beside Lal Kothi Road, Karpoor Nagar, Katihar in the Indian state of Bihar. It offers 5 years integrated LL.B. course which is approved by Bar Council of India (BCI), New Delhi and affiliated to Purnea University.

History
Suryadeo Law College was established in 1982. Initially this college was affiliated to Lalit Narayan Mithila University, Darbhanga then it was affiliated to B.N. Mandal University Madhepura. Presently it is under the affiliation of Purnea University.

References

External links 

Law schools in Bihar
Universities and colleges in Bihar
Educational institutions established in 1982
1982 establishments in Bihar
Colleges affiliated to Purnea University